Erkki Olavi Savolainen (August 21, 1917 in Helsinki – December 26, 1993 in Helsinki) was a Finnish boxer who competed in the 1936 Summer Olympics.

In 1936 he was eliminated in the first round of the flyweight class after losing his fight to Chiyoto Nakano.

1936 Olympic results
Below are the results of Erkki Savolainen, a Finnish boxer who competed in the flyweight division at the 1936 Berlin Olympics:

 Round of 32: lost to Chiyoto Nakano (Japan)

External links
profile

1917 births
1993 deaths
Sportspeople from Helsinki
Flyweight boxers
Olympic boxers of Finland
Boxers at the 1936 Summer Olympics
Finnish male boxers